Beyond Coma and Despair is the third album by Indonesian metal band Burgerkill, released in 2006. The album was also released in Australia two years later. This is the band's last album to feature Ivan Scumbag on lead vocals before his death in July 2006. Two music videos were produced for "Shadow of Sorrow" and "Angkuh". Rolling Stone Indonesia magazine ranked the album No. 113 on their "150 Greatest Indonesian Albums of All Time" list.

Background 
Burgerkill began to work on Beyond Coma and Despair in early 2005, where at the same time, Toto left the band after nine years together as drummer to pursue his career outside the band. He was replaced by Andris, who at that time was playing bass, and did double-duty during recording. This coincided with the end of their collaboration with Sony Music Indonesia due to no agreement by both parties regarding the album materials. the band released the album through own Revolt! A few weeks before the album was released, Ivan Firmansyah, known as "Ivan Scumbag", died. The album launch continued with Teguh ("Right 88") and Yadi ("Motordead") temporarily filling-in. During this period, Ramdan joined the band on bass guitar and Vicky joined through an audition to be vocalist. "Beyond Coma and Despair" consists of 12 songs including 1 cover song "Atur Aku" of "Puppen", written by Robin Malau and Arian Arifin known as "Arian 13" ("Seringai").

Track listing
The tracks titled in Bahasa were translated literally into English for Global observer. All songs arrangements, composed by Eben, Agung and Ivan Scumbag. except those listed.

Line-up

Burgerkill
 Ivan Scumbag – vocals
 Andris – drums, bass
 Agung – guitar
 Eben – lead guitar

Production
 Yayat Ahdiyat – producer
 Eben BKHC – artwork

Additional musicians
 Ramdan – session bass, tour bassist
 Vicky – tour vocals
 Achan – tour lead guitar, scream vocal
 Yadi - tour vocal
 Teguh - tour vocal

References

External links
 
 

2006 albums
Burgerkill albums